The First Presbyterian Church in McMinnville, Tennessee, also known as Cumberland Presbyterian Church, is a historic Presbyterian church at 205 W. Main Street. It was added to the National Register of Historic Places in 1995.

The congregation was founded around 1839 and its first building, a simple one-story brick building, was built around 1840.  That building was destroyed in a fire in 1865.  This new church was built on a new site in 1872.

It is a one-story brick church upon a raised basement and limestone foundation.  An alcove was added in 1906 and the church was extended to the rear in 1966 with a two-story brick addition.

References

Presbyterian churches in Tennessee
Churches on the National Register of Historic Places in Tennessee
Gothic Revival church buildings in Tennessee
Churches completed in 1872
Buildings and structures in Warren County, Tennessee
National Register of Historic Places in Warren County, Tennessee